State Route 374 (SR 374) is north–south state highway in Hocking County, Ohio, located in the southern portion of the state. The road serves Hocking State Forest as well as Hocking Hills State Park, and the entire highway is part of the designated Hocking Hills Scenic Byway.

Route description

History
In 1932, an unnumbered gravel road was included into the state highway system between Mound Crossing at SR 180 (now the southernmost intersection on SR 374 with SR 180) and the road that is now SR 664 in rural Hocking County. By 1934, the route had been numbered SR 374. In 1938, SR 374 was extended at both ends by taking over what was SR 664 between SR 56 and Cedar Grove at the south end and was routed along SR 180 between Mound Crossing and what was then SR 678, and then along SR 678 to Rockbridge at the intersection of US 33. A slight realignment occurred in the area of the Old Man's Caves within Hocking Hills State Park (along the section concurrent with SR 664) between 2011 and 2013. The realignment was needed to reduce the conflict between traffic on the road and pedestrians in the vicinity of the park. The  realignment opened by January 2013.

Major intersections

References

374
Transportation in Hocking County, Ohio